Catiuscia Grillo (born 29 December 1996) is an Italian professional racing cyclist who rides for Top Girls Fassa Bortolo.

See also
 List of 2016 UCI Women's Teams and riders

References

External links
 

1996 births
Living people
Italian female cyclists
Place of birth missing (living people)